What do you know may refer to:
Whad'Ya Know?, an American comedy, interview, and quiz radio show
What Do You Know?, a BBC Radio quiz show
What Do You Know? (TV series), an Australian children's TV programme
What Do You Know, Deutschland?, a 1986 album by KMFDM

See also

What You Know (disambiguation)